That's My Baby is a 1926 American silent comedy film directed by William Beaudine. A surviving copy is preserved in a European archive, Paris.

Cast
 Douglas MacLean as Alan Boyd
 Margaret Morris as Helen Raynor
 Claude Gillingwater as John Raynor
 Eugenie Forde as Mrs. John Raynor
 Wade Boteler as Dave Barton
 Richard Tucker as Schuyler Van Loon
 Fred Kelsey as Murphy
 Harry Earles as The Baby
 William Orlamond as Drug Clerk

References

External links

 

1926 films
1926 comedy films
Silent American comedy films
American silent feature films
American black-and-white films
Films directed by William Beaudine
1920s American films